Thomas Thennatt, SAC (26 November 1953 – 14 December 2018) was an Indian Roman Catholic bishop.

Thennatt was born in India and was ordained to the priesthood in 1978. He served as bishop of the Roman Catholic Diocese of Gwalior, India, from 2016 until his death in 2018.

Notes

1953 births
2018 deaths
21st-century Roman Catholic bishops in India